Throughout its existence the London and North Western Railway re-used the numbers and names of withdrawn locomotives on new ones as they came out of Crewe Works. This resulted in each class of locomotives being allotted numbers virtually at random, with names that adhered to no discernible theme. By 1911 new locomotives were being produced at a much faster rate than old ones were being scrapped, and it became necessary to introduce a new set of names for Bowen Cooke’s 4-6-0 express engines which were beginning to enter service.

On 13 July 1911 Prince Edward, the future King Edward VIII, was invested as Prince of Wales at Caernarfon Castle. The investiture gave the LNWR an opportunity to name the first of the locomotives (and the class) in honour of the new Prince. A further nine engines were built during 1911 and given names associated with ships of the Royal Navy, in keeping with the patriotic sentiments of the time.

The second batch of 30 locomotives of 1913 and early 1914 commemorated British, European and American poets and novelists of the 18th and 19th centuries. The final engine of the batch was named G.P. Neele in honour of the former LNWR Superintendent of the Line, who had retired in 1895.

The ten engines produced in 1915 were given the names of the leaders of Britain’s allies in the Great War, and the names of two soldiers, a sailor, and a nurse who had been executed by the Germans. By the beginning of 1916 sufficient engines had been scrapped to enable the re-use of historical LNWR names. However in March and April of that year three locomotives were named in remembrance of the ill-fated campaign in the Dardanelles, and seven were named to commemorate maritime losses of 1915 and 1916.

The next batch of locomotives entered service in January 1919, by which time a decision had been taken not to allocate names until matters had returned to normal after the war. It was not until 1922 that another twelve engines were given names taken from former LNWR engines.

During 1921 and 1922 a further 90 locomotives of the class were built by William Beardmore and Company at Dalmuir. These remained nameless.

Following the absorption of the LNWR into the London, Midland and Scottish Railway in 1923, the LMS Rolling Stock Committee at Derby issued Minute no. 53 on 31 May 1923 which announced that in conformity with former Midland Railway practices
“Passenger engines and coaching stock to be painted in old Midland crimson lake, goods engines to be black without lining – new engines not to be named but those with names will continue to do so.”
One of the last locomotives to be named at Crewe was No. 5753 Premier, a clear reference to the LNWR slogan of being "the Premier Line", and a final and defiant gesture aimed at the new management in Derby.

The LMS renumbered all of the Prince of Wales in a block from 5600 to 5844, but not in exactly the same order that the locomotives had been built. A final locomotive was built by Beardmore in February 1924, which was displayed at the British Empire Exhibition that year; the LMS bought it in November 1924, and numbered it 5845.

References

 
 
 
 
 

Prince of Wales Class, List
4-6-0 locomotives
Railway locomotives introduced in 1911
British railway-related lists
Standard gauge steam locomotives of Great Britain